Advances in Radio Science is a peer-reviewed open access scientific journal published by the German National Committee of the International Union of Radio Science. It covers radio science and radio engineering. It is abstracted and indexed in Scopus.

See also 
 Radio Science

External links 

Electrical and electronic engineering journals
Publications established in 2003
Multilingual journals
Copernicus Publications academic journals
Creative Commons Attribution-licensed journals